Nadav Guedj (born 2 November 1998) is an Israeli singer and actor who represented Israel in the Eurovision Song Contest 2015. He is the winner of season two of HaKokhav HaBa (Israel's Rising Star). Guedj was born in Paris.

Personal life
He was born to an Algerian Jewish family in Paris, then moved to Israel.

Guedj lives in Netanya. In 2016, he enlisted in the Israeli Army.

Musical career

2014: HaKokhav HaBa
Nadav entered the second season HaKokhav HaBa, the Israeli national selections for Eurovision Song Contest 2015 where he became one of the sixteen finalists. He is the youngest participant of the contest's second season, just turning sixteen when turned up for the first audition day. He sang "Russian Roulette" by Rihanna for his first audition and Stevie Wonder's "Lately" for the second audition.

In the second round of the contest proper, Nadav performed "Halo" by Beyoncé. He advanced to the semi-finals of the contest along with six other contestants where he performed "Mirrors" by Justin Timberlake. He then reached the finals of the contest with four other contestants after performing "Locked Out of Heaven" by Bruno Mars in a duets battle against fellow contestant Orit Biansay. Nadav then won HaKokhav HaBa with his performance of Beyoncé's "Halo" on 17 February 2015.

2015–16: Eurovision Song Contest and debut album
With his title win HaKokhav HaBa, Guedj qualified to become Israel's entrant to the Eurovision Song Contest 2015. On 26 February 2015, it was announced that he would be singing Golden Boy at the Eurovision.

On 12 March 2015, Golden Boy was released and is Israel's first entry to the contest that's entirely sung in English.

On 21 May 2015, Nadav performed in the Eurovision song contest's second semi-final in Vienna and he has successfully made Israel reach the final for the first time in five years. At the final on 23 May, he finished 9th overall with 97 points. The postcards – short video clips introducing the participants – of this year's contest witness the slogan "Building Bridges". Each of the clips start with every contestant receiving an invitation to Austria in their home country. The story continues with the contestants making their way to one of Austria's nine states where they have an individual task to fulfill.

Nadav's postcard was filmed on location in Tel Aviv and the renowned skiing resort Lech am Arlberg in Vorarlberg, where Guedj is seen spray painting a gondola lift with the Austrian cartoon artist and musician Bernd Püribauer.

After the contest, Nadav's music video for his Coca-Cola-endorsed Song "Summer Together", Again written by Medalie, for the "Coca Cola Summer Love" events in Israel, has been released on 8 August. On 19 August 2015, he released the single "Good Vibes", he wrote the song with Ruby Feier. On 1 December 2015, he released the single "Jump". On 2 March 2016 he released the single "Make You Mine". On 15 May 2016 he released the single "Hold the City". He released his debut self-studio album on 25 May 2016.

2017–present: Upcoming second album 
On 26 December 2017, he released the single "Ulay Nedaber", his first song in Hebrew. On 19 August 2018, he released the single "Ma At Omeret", second single from his second album. On 28 July 2019, he released the third single from his second album, "38 Ma'alot", which serves as the theme song for the Israeli movie Full Gas, which includes Guedj as an actor.

Acting career 
In 2018, Guedj began his acting career when he acted in the third season of the Israeli teen drama Cadabra.

In 2019, he acted in the Israeli movie Full Gas.

In 2021, he acted in the Israeli TV series "HaYoreshet", on channel 12.

Artistry

Musical influences
Nadav frequently listens to music of the R&B, pop, soul and hip hop genres and cites Pharrell Williams, Usher, Beyoncé, Chris Brown, Maroon 5, Snoop Dogg, Stevie Wonder, Michael Jackson, Justin Timberlake, Timbaland and others as his favorite artists. He is hailed in his home country as the "Israeli Justin Timberlake" because of the similarity of his musical style, but he describes himself as "simple and regular Nadav".

Discography

Albums

Singles

References

External links

1998 births
Living people
Eurovision Song Contest entrants of 2015
21st-century French Jews
French pop singers
English-language singers from Israel
Eurovision Song Contest entrants for Israel
21st-century Israeli male singers
French emigrants to Israel
Israeli pop singers
21st-century French male singers